Various residences for archbishops are locally known as the Archbishop's Palace, including the following:

 Archbishop's Palace, Perth, Australia
 Metropolitan Palace, Lviv, Austria, also known as Archbishop's Palace
 Archbishop's Palace of Salvador, Brazil
 Archbishop's Palace, Nicosia, Cyprus
 Archbishop's Palace, Prague, Czech Republic, residence of Cardinal Friedrich Prince zu Schwarzenberg
 Kromeriz Archbishop's Palace, Czech Republic
 Archbishop's Palace, Charing, Kent, England
 Archbishop's Palace, Maidstone, Kent, England
 Old Palace, Canterbury, Kent England, also known as Archbishop's Palace
 Otford Palace, also known as Archbishop's Palace, Otford, Kent, England
 Archbishop's Palace, in Worthing, Sussex, England
 Archbishop's Palace, York, England
 Archbishop's Palace, Bishopthorpe, York, England
 Palais Rohan, Bordeaux, France, formerly the Archbishop's Palace
 Archbishop's Palace of Paris, France
 Archbishop's Palace, Nicosia, Greece
 Archbishop's Palace (Naples), Italy
 Archbishop's Palace, Vilnius, Lithuania
 Archbishop's Palace, Mdina, Malta
 Archbishop's Palace, Valletta, Malta
 Archbishop's Palace, Armagh, Northern Ireland
 Archbishop's Palace, Trondheim, Norway
 Archbishop's Palace of Lima, Peru
 Palacio Arzobispal, Manila, Philippines
 Archbishop's Palace, Braga, Portugal
 Archbishop's Palace, Constanța, Romania 
 Summer Archbishop's Palace, Bratislava, Slovakia
 Archbishop's Palace of Alcalá de Henares, Spain
 Archbishop's Palace, Seville, Spain
 Archbishop's Palace of Toledo, Spain
 Archbishop's Palace, Uppsala, Sweden

See also 
 Bishop's Palace (disambiguation)
 Episcopal Palace (disambiguation)